Moondance Alexander is a 2007 American comedy-drama film directed by Michael Damian and written by Janeen Damian. The film was released in North America in October 2007. The story is shot on location in Okotoks, High River and Calgary, Alberta, Canada and is based on actual events from the life of Janeen Damian. It stars former Summerland co-stars Kay Panabaker as Moondance Alexander and Lori Loughlin as Gelsey Alexander. The movie co-stars Don Johnson and Olympic-skating silver medalist Sasha Cohen.

Plot
Moondance (Kay Panabaker) is faced with the difficulties of her father's passing and her overprotective mother (Lori Loughlin). When she finds a lost pinto horse and discovers his jumping abilities, she convinces his owner Dante Longpre (Don Johnson) to train them to compete in a mop show. With a lot more to think about, Moondance has to worry about her enemy Fiona Hughes (Sasha Cohen) putting her down constantly with her fancy horse Monte Carlo. When they do a surprisingly good job at the show, Dante isn't questioned anymore about his ability to train riders and horses. Everybody is shocked when Moondance ties Fiona, the reigning Bow River Classic champion.

Cast
Kay Panabaker as Moondance Alexander
Don Johnson as Dante Longpre
Lori Loughlin as Gelsey Alexander
James Best as Mr.McClancy
Sasha Cohen as Fiona Hughes
Whitney Sloan as Megan Montgomery
Joe Norman Shaw as Ben Wilson
Aedan Tomney as Josh Wilson
Mimi Gianopulos as Bella
Landon Liboiron as Freddie

Behind the scenes 
Moondance Alexander was not well received by HorseChannel.com for storyline believability reasons. However, the story is closely based upon Janeen Damian's childhood experience of befriending a horse that she had found, receiving help from a trainer, and entering the horse in the Memphis Classic.

Moondance Alexander is a true family film, written by Janeen Damian and husband Michael Damian (born Michael Damian Weir), Damian, a Daytime Emmy Award winner, was also the producer of the film. Much of the music was written by Damian's brother, music producer and New Music Weekly editor, Larry Weir. Emmy Award winning Tom Weir was the mixing engineer at Studio City Sound.

Checkers the horse was played by three horses, a horse for tricks, a horse for jumping and a horse for Kay Panabaker to ride. Michael Damian recalled two of the horses names as Picasso and Trigger. The third horse's name is Spook.

Moondance Alexander received a U.S. General Audiences rating and was filmed in Alberta, Canada.

|+ 

|-
| 2007
| Best Picture
| Dixie Film Festival 
|
|-
|2007
| Best Actress (Kay Panabaker)
| Dixie Film Festival 
|  
|}

Soundtrack 
The Moondance Alexander Original Soundtrack was the second soundtrack released under the Caption Records label.

Featured vocalists 

 Mimi Gianopulos
 Lea Herman   
 Tessa Ludwick
 Buck McCoy
 Monét Monico
 Sara Niemietz
 Ian Walsh
 Laura Wight
 Heather Youmans

Musicians 

 Bernie Barlow, Vocals
 Paul Bushnel, Bass
 Michael Chaves, Guitar
 Jorge Costa, Vocals (Background)
 Michael Damian, Percussion,  Vocals (Background)
 Milo Decruz Bass, Guitar, Keyboards, Percussion, Producer
 Burleigh Drummond, Percussion
 Blake Ewing, Vocals (Background)
 Josh Freese, Drums
 Joshua Grange, Guitar
 Lea Herman,  Keyboards, Vocals (Background)
 Matt Laug, Drums
 Lance Morrison, Bass
 Ginger Murphy, Cello
 Leah Nelson, Viola
 Michael Parnell, Keyboards
 Tim Pierce, Guitar
 Cam Tyler, Drums
 Ian Walsh, Bass,  Guitar, Piano, Vocals (Background)
 Kevin Walsh, Guitar
 Larry Weir,  Percussion,  Vocals (Background)

Personnel 

 Jorge Costa, Audio Engineer, Engineer
 James Gaynor, Audio Engineer
 Josh Mosser, Audio Engineer
 Luke Tozour, Audio Engineer, Engineer
 Tom Weir, Audio Engineer, Engineer

References

External links
 Moondance Alexander on Facebook
 
 
 

2007 films
2007 comedy-drama films
American comedy-drama films
Films about horses
Films set in Colorado
American films based on actual events
Films directed by Michael Damian
Albums produced by Larry Weir
Sara Niemietz songs
2007 comedy films
2007 drama films
2000s English-language films
2000s American films